Jean Breuer (14 December 1919 – 6 November 1986) was a Belgian racing cyclist. He rode in the 1947 and 1949 Tour de France.

References

External links

1919 births
1986 deaths
Belgian male cyclists
Sportspeople from Liège
Cyclists from Liège Province